The 2007 Speedway Grand Prix of Poland was the ninth race of the 2007 Speedway Grand Prix season.  It took place on 8 September in the Polonia Stadium in Bydgoszcz, Poland.

Starting positions draw 

(2) Greg Hancock (United States)
(15) Chris Harris (United Kingdom)
(5) Leigh Adams (Australia)
(6) Hans N. Andersen (Denmark)
(13) Wiesław Jaguś (Poland)
(7) Matej Žagar (Slovenia)
(10) Antonio Lindbäck (Sweden)
(9) Jarosław Hampel (Poland)
(4) Andreas Jonsson (Sweden)
(8) Tomasz Gollob (Poland)
(14) Rune Holta (Poland)
(12) Bjarne Pedersen (Denmark)
(16) Krzysztof Kasprzak (Poland)
(11) Scott Nicholls (United Kingdom)
(1) Jason Crump (Australia)
(3) Nicki Pedersen (Denmark)
(17) Krzysztof Buczkowski (Poland)
(18) Adrian Miedziński (Poland)

Heat details

Heat after heat 
 (64,97) Adams, Andersen, Hancock, Harris
 (66,63) Hampel, Jaguś, Zagar, Lindbaeck
 (65,22) B.Pedersen, Gollob, Jonsson, Holta
 (64,56) Kasprzak, N.Pedersen, Crump, Nicholls
 (64,44) Jonsson, Hancock, Jaguś, Kasprzak
 (64,38) Gollob, Harris, Zagar, Nicholls
 (64,69) Holta, Crump, Adams, Lindbaeck
 (65,07) N.Pedersen, Hampel, B.Pedersen, Andersen (F/X)
 (64,78) N.Pedersen, Holta, Zagar, Hancock
 (65,35) B.Pedersen, Harris, Crump, Jaguś
 (64,53) Hampel, Nicholls, Adams, Jonsson
 (64,75) Kasprzak, Gollob, Lindbaeck, Andersen
 (66,59) Lindbaeck, Hancock, B.Pedersen, Nicholls
 (66,13) Kasprzak, Holta, Harris, Hampel
 (65,00) N.Pedersen, Gollob, Jaguś, Adams
 (64,81) Jonsson, Crump, Andersen, Zagar
 (65,72) Gollob, Hampel, Crump, Hancock
 (65,75) N.Pedersen, Jonsson, Lindbaeck, Harris (F4)
 (65,09) Adams, Kasprzak, Zagar, B.Pedersen
 (65,29) Holta, Nicholls, Jaguś, Andersen
Semi-Final:
 (64,25) N.Pedersen, Jonsson, Adams, Holta
 (64,69) Gollob, Kasprzak, Hampel, B.Pedersen
Final:
 (64.17) Gollob (6 points), Kasprzak (4 pts), N.Pedersen (2 pts), Jonsson

The intermediate classification

See also 
 List of Speedway Grand Prix riders

References 

Poland
2007
2007
2007 in Polish speedway